Patauda is a village of Jhajjar District in the Indian state of Haryana located in the south of National Capital Territory of Delhi, 78 kilometres south of New Delhi and 12 kilometres from Pataudi.There is one more village called Patauda Khera is also under the Patauda panchayat.

Patauda village is a part of Badli Constituency. 
Kuldeep Vats of Congress is the MLA from Badli Constituency.

Population

Schools in Patauda 
 Govt.Sr.Sec.School
 Govt.Primary School
 Govt.Kanya Pathsala
 SD High School
 New Bloom Sr.Sec.School
 GAV Sr.Sec. School
 V.K.Public School
 Reliance Public School
 The Great Rajputana Public school
 Sanskaram International School

Colleges in Patauda
 Sanskaram Veterinary College
 Sanskaram College of Veterinary and Animal Science
 GAV Polytechnic, Patauda
 GAV Group of Institutions

Banks in Patauda 
 State Bank of India
 Co-Operative Bank

ATMs Nearby Patauda

1. STATE BANK OF INDIA ATM 
PATAUDA, Jhajjar, Haryana 124108; India 
0.8 km distance

2. HDFC Bank ATM 
Kulana, Haryana 124108; India 
3.7 km distance

3. Punjab National Bank ATM 
Machhrauli, Jhajjar, Haryana 124108; India 
10.1 km distance

Temples in Patauda,Jhajjar 

 Baba Punjabi Aashram
 Holika Dahan Ground 
 Shiv Ji Temple 
 Shiv Shanidev Mandir 
 Hanuman Ji Mandir
 Radha Krishna Mandir
 Devi Mata Mandir
 Goga Ji Mandir
 Balaji Mandir
 Khatu Shyam ji Mandir
 Ram Mandir
 Baba Ram Nath Ji Mandir
 Baba Chautrawala Maharaj Ji Mandir

Railway station Nearby 
Pataudi Road (10 km away from village)

References

External links
 Patauda; wikimapia

Haryana